Matthew E. Ammon is an American civil servant who served as the acting United States Secretary of Housing and Urban Development in the Biden administration from January to March 2021. Ammon served an interim capacity until Biden's nominee, Marcia Fudge, was confirmed by the United States Senate on March 10, 2021.

Career 
Ammon has previously held senior positions within the HUD, including directing the Office of Lead Hazard Control and Healthy Homes, and has worked there for over 25 years.

Acting HUD secretary 
After President Biden signed a presidential memorandum in January 2021 titled "Redressing Our Nation’s and the Federal Government’s History of Discriminatory Housing Practices and Policies", Ammon described it as "a vital step" and "meaningful action [towards advancing] racial equity in housing and [expanding] opportunity for all".

Under Ammon's leadership, the HUD also promised to investigate and prohibit instances of anti-LGBTQ housing discrimination (under the Fair Housing Act) and awarded $2.5 billion of federal funds to renew support for thousands of homeless assistance programs across the United States.

References 

Biden administration cabinet members
United States Department of Housing and Urban Development officials
United States Secretaries of Housing and Urban Development
Living people
Year of birth missing (living people)